Tai Sang Wai, sometimes transliterated as Tai Shang Wai, is a village in the San Tin area of Yuen Long District, Hong Kong.

History
The development of Fairview Park on fish farming land at Tai Shang Wai was a source of controversy at the time of its planning and construction in the mid-1970s. Concerns included ecological aspects, due to its proximity to marshland bordering Deep Bay, and the transport implications, with the majority of the inhabitants expected to work in the Victoria Harbour area.

Education
Tai Sang Wai is in Primary One Admission (POA) School Net 74. Within the school net are multiple aided schools (operated independently but funded with government money) and one government school: Yuen Long Government Primary School (元朗官立小學).

References

Further reading

External links

 Delineation of area of existing village Tai Sang Wai (San Tin) for election of resident representative (2019 to 2022)

Villages in Yuen Long District, Hong Kong
San Tin